Mjøsa is Norway's largest lake, as well as one of the deepest lakes in Norway and in Europe. It is the fourth-deepest lake in Norway. Its main tributary is the river Gudbrandsdalslågen flowing in from the north; the only distributary is the river Vorma in the south. Inflows would theoretically need 5.6 years to fill the lake.

This is lower than the deepest point of the sea inlet of Kattegat and the lower than the vast majority of Skagerrak off Norway's south coast. Mjøsa retains a larger average depth than both the North Sea and Baltic Sea respectively.

Thomas Robert Malthus traveled through Norway in 1799 and his diaries from the trip includes a description of Mjøsa. Malthus wrote that Mjøsa appears as both lake and river because the shores are defined by mountains and where the valley becomes wider the water fills the space. Below Minde (Minnesund) the lake only appears like a river and is called Vorma on the map, according to Malthus.

Location

During the 19th and 20th centuries, there have been 20 floods recorded that added at least  to the level of the lake which caused flooding. Several of these floods inundated the city of Hamar.

The towns of Hamar, Gjøvik, and Lillehammer were founded along the shores of the lake. Before the construction of railways past the lake, it was an important transport route. Today, aside from minor leisure boating and the steamship Skibladner, there is no water traffic on the lake. Most of its shores are dominated by rolling agricultural areas, among them some of the most fertile grainlands in Norway. The main train line, the Dovre Line between Oslo and Trondheim, goes along its eastern shore, making stops at Hamar Station and Lillehammer Station. From the south, the European route E6 highway runs along the eastern shore of the lake until the Mjøsa Bridge connects Moelv on the east with Biri on the west.

Mjøskastellet

The largest and only island in the lake is Helgøya. Except for Helgøya, Mjøsa only contains small islets. The most interesting of these is Steinsholmen, which holds the ruins of Mjøskastellet, a medieval citadel dating from the 13th century. Established by King Haakon IV of Norway, it was first mentioned historically in a letter dated 1234. Peter Andreas Blix documented the site and made drawings in 1897. Hedmark Museum has a future archaeological plan for the site.

Fish
Lake Mjøsa has 20 species of fish. Another common species is the European smelt, which is the most important bait fish for the predators. Historically, the most economically significant species is the lågsild (European cisco).

Source of drinking water 
Several municipal and urban areas use the lake as their source of drinking water.
Hamar / Ottestad – Hias IKS has responsibility for the waterworks and waste water treatment plants in Hamar Municipality, Stange Municipality, and Løten Municipality.
Lillehammer –  Operates waterworks at Korgen. Contracts have been signed for a new flood-proof waterworks to be built in Hovemoen.
Gjøvik – WWTP run from Rambekk Renseanlegg
Østre Toten – Kapp / Skreia
Brumunddal – Biri / Moelv

Name
The lake is named "Mjøsa" ( / Proto-Norse *Merso) and this name must be very old. The meaning is possibly "the bright/shiny one". This is based on the theory that the first element *mer- is related to the English word mere which means "clear" or "bright" and -so is a suffix.

Events
From 1932 to 1934, ice racing was held on the lake's northern reaches near Lillehammer. Warmer winters had forced race organisers to move racing from Gjersjøen near Oslo. The Norwegian Grand Prix was held there in 1934. The race was won by Swedish driver Per-Viktor Widengren in an Alfa Romeo 8C but poor attendance saw the Grand Prix move back to the Oslo region in 1935.

In 1975, the 14th World Scout Jamboree was held on its shores. More than 17,000 Scouts from 91 countries took part.

In 1995, a Canadian historic aircraft organization named Halifax 57 Rescue recovered a mostly intact Handley Page Halifax bomber from it, which was previously discovered in 1991 to be resting at a depth of 750 feet (228.6 m). The aircraft, NA337, was shot down at 0131 hours on 24 April 1945 while returning from a supply mission and crashed shortly after. It was later restored extensively to its original state (albeit non – flying) and is now one of only three remaining examples of the type anywhere in the world.

Culture projects
The inter-county public art collaboration project,  is a model for inter-organizational cooperation and collaboration between local municipalities and counties. It is a public "land-art" project that was supported by the Oppland County Municipality and Hedmark County Municipality as well as local municipalities of Eidsvoll, Gjøvik, Hamar, Lillehammer, Ringsaker, Stange, and Østre Toten. These communities all share shoreline with Mjøsa. Det Var Jo Ingen Horizont Der, is an environmental art collaboration including the works of 12 artists' sculptural and multimedia environmental artworks installed at 20 geographic places on and around the shores of Mjøsa. The project is documented in a book and it was part of an exhibition at the Mjøsmuseet (museum) in 2019.

See also
 Toftes Gave

References

External links
Mjøskastellet  (DigitaltMuseum)
 

Lakes of Innlandet
Lakes of Viken (county)
Hamar
Gjøvik
Stange
Ringsaker
Eidsvoll
Lillehammer
Østre Toten